Bill Blair may refer to:

Bill Blair (American Association pitcher) (1863–1890), Major League Baseball player
Bill Blair (basketball) (born 1942), American basketball player
Bill Blair (Negro Leagues pitcher) (1921–2014), Negro league pitcher
Bill Blair (politician), Canadian Minister and Member of Parliament and former Toronto Police Chief
Bill Blair (racing driver) (1911–1995), NASCAR Cup Series driver

See also
William Blair (disambiguation)